1200 Aluminium alloy has aluminium as the major element, and has silicon, zinc, copper, titanium and manganese as minor elements.

Chemical Composition

Mechanical Properties

Applications 
Applications of 1200 Aluminium alloy are listed below: 

 Construction and roofing
 Holloware
 Equipment and containers for food and chemical industries
 Ship building
 Fin-stocks
 Bottle caps
 Automobiles
 Furniture and lighting
 Sounding boards
 Conductive materials

References

Aluminum alloy table 

 Aluminium alloys